Bernard Joly (26 October 1934 – 10 January 2020) was a French politician who served as Senator.

Biography
Elected Senator in 1995, Joly was a member of the European Democratic and Social Rally group. He did not seek reelection in 2004.

References

1934 births
2020 deaths
20th-century French politicians
21st-century French politicians
People from Troyes
French Senators of the Fifth Republic